Ignazio Belluardo (born 2 August 1986, in Syracuse) is an Italian racing driver. He has competed in such series as International Formula Master, winning twice during the 2006 season.

References

External links
 Official website
 

1986 births
Living people
People from Syracuse, Sicily
Italian racing drivers
International Formula Master drivers
Sportspeople from the Province of Syracuse